Empicoris seorsus is a species of thread-legged bug endemic to New Zealand. It is one of four species of Empicoris present in New Zealand.

References

Reduviidae
Hemiptera of New Zealand
Insects described in 1826
Taxa named by Ernst Evald Bergroth